The 55th edition of the Vuelta a España (Tour of Spain), a long-distance bicycle stage race and one of the three grand tours, was held from 26 August to 17 September  2000. The defending champion, Jan Ullrich, withdrew after the 12th stage while sitting in fourth place to prepare for the Olympic Road Race.

Teams and riders

Route

Jersey progress

Final standings

References

External links
La Vuelta (Official site in Spanish, English, and French)
 Cyclingnews.com 2000 Vuelta a Espana coverage

 
2000
2000 in Spanish sport
2000 in road cycling